The National Union of Banks, Insurance and Financial Institution Employees (NUBIFIE) is a trade union representing workers in the finance industry in Nigeria.

The union was founded in 1978, when the Government of Nigeria merged nine unions:

 Bank of the North Staff Union
 British American Insurance Workers' Union of Nigeria
 Co-operative Union of Western Nigeria Ltd. Staff Association
 Ekiti-Joint Co-operative Movement Staff Union
 National Insurance Corporation of Nigeria Workers' Union
 Nigerian Union of Banks, Insurance and Allied Workers
 Royal Exchange Assurance Staff Union
 United Dominions Corporation and Allied Workers' Union of Nigeria
 Western Nigeria Finance and Agricultural Credit Corporation Workers' Union

The union affiliated to the Nigeria Labour Congress.  It had 69,613 members in 1988, and 80,000 by 1995.  In 2016, the union left the NLC to become a founding constituent of the United Labour Congress (ULC).  However, in 2020, the whole ULC rejoined the NLC.

External links

References

Finance sector trade unions
Trade unions established in 1978
Trade unions in Nigeria